The Vagrancy Act 1824 (5 Geo. 4. c. 83) is an Act of Parliament of the United Kingdom that makes it an offence to sleep rough or beg in England and Wales. It is still mostly in force and enforceable.

Critics, including William Wilberforce, condemned the Act for being a catch-all offence because it did not consider the circumstances as to why an individual might be placed in such a predicament.

Background

The law was enacted to deal with the increasing numbers of homeless and penniless urban poor in England and Wales following the conclusion of the Napoleonic Wars in 1815. Nine years after the Battle of Waterloo the British Army and Royal Navy had both undergone a massive reduction in size, leaving large numbers of discharged soldiers and sailors without an occupation or accommodation.  Many were living rough on the streets or in makeshift camps. At the same time a massive influx of economic migrants from Ireland and Scotland arrived in England, especially into London, in search of work.  Politicians in the unreformed House of Commons became concerned that parish constables were becoming ineffective in controlling these "vagrants".  Furthermore the medieval pass laws which gave itinerant travelling people free movement through a given district were considered to be no longer effective.

Offences
Punishment for the wide definition of vagrancy (including prostitution) was up to one month's hard labour.

The Act of 1824 was amended several times, most notably by the Vagrancy Act 1838, which introduced a number of new public order offences covering acts that were deemed at the time to be likely to cause moral outrage. It contained a provision for the prosecution of "every Person wilfully exposing to view, in any Street ... or public Place, any obscene Print, Picture, or other indecent Exhibition".

Although the Act of 1824 originally applied only to England and Wales, Section 4 of the Act, which dealt mainly with vagrancy and begging, was extended to Scotland and Ireland by section 15 of the Prevention of Crimes Act 1871. This section (and consequently the extension beyond England and Wales) was repealed by the Criminal Attempts Act 1981.

The Vagrancy Act 1898 prohibited soliciting or importuning for immoral purposes. Originally intended as a measure against prostitution, in practice the legislation was almost solely used to convict men for gay sex.

The Criminal Law Amendment Act 1912, extended provisions of the 1824 Act to Scotland and Ireland, and suppressed brothels.

Current status
The original Vagrancy Act 1824 remains in force in England and Wales until a replacement Act is created. In 1982 the entire Act was repealed in Scotland by the Civic Government (Scotland) Act. An attempt was made in 1981 to repeal Section 4 (and so, in effect, decriminalise begging and homelessness) in England and Wales, but the bill (the Vagrancy Offences (Repeal) Bill) did not progress beyond first reading.

In Ireland, Section 18 of the Firearms and Offensive Weapons Act 1990 repealed section 4 of the 1824 Act (begging and vagrancy).

Under the Act discharged military personnel continue to be granted exemption certificates allowing them to appeal for alms under certain circumstances.

Modern use
In 1988 some 573 people were prosecuted and convicted under the Act in England and Wales, rising to 1,396 by 1989. In May 1990 the National Association of Probation Officers carried out a survey of prosecutions under the Act. That survey revealed that 1,250 prosecutions had been dealt with in 14 magistrates courts in Central London in 1988, which represented an enormous leap in the number of prosecutions under the Act, especially in London.

In 2014 three men were arrested and charged under Section 4 of the 1824 Vagrancy Act for stealing food that had been put in skips and bins outside an Iceland supermarket in Kentish Town, North London. Paul May, William James and Jason Chan were due to stand trial after allegedly taking cheese, tomatoes and cakes worth £33 from bins behind the shop. The Iceland chain denied any involvement in contacting the police, and in a public statement it questioned why the Crown Prosecution Service (CPS) felt that it was in the public interest to pursue a case against the three individuals.
The three men, all of no fixed address, were due to attend a hearing at Highbury Magistrates' Court on 3 February 2014. However, before that date the CPS announced its decision to drop the case, stating that it felt it had not given due weight to the public interest factors tending against prosecution.
In 2020, 573 people were prosecuted under the act.

In 2020 and 2021, calls for reform of the law in England have been growing with increasing pressure placed on Government by homelessness campaigners, members of parliament and other NGOs. This has led to comments from some senior figures in the UK Government that the Act should be repealed.

In April 2022, the Police, Crime, Sentencing and Courts Act 2022 was enacted and given Royal Assent. It contains a provision that would repeal the Vagrancy Act 1824, but this provision must be brought into force by the Secretary of State. The government doesn't intend to commence this repealing provision until appropriate replacement legislation is passed.

See also
Criminalization of homelessness
 UK Vagrancy Acts
 Vagrancy

References

United Kingdom Acts of Parliament 1824
Homelessness in the United Kingdom
1824 in England
1824 in Wales
Homelessness in Wales
Acts of the Parliament of the United Kingdom concerning England and Wales
Homelessness in England
1824
Housing legislation in the United Kingdom